The 45th Annual TV Week Logie Awards was held on Sunday 11 May 2003 at the Crown Palladium in Melbourne, and broadcast on the Nine Network. The ceremony was hosted by Eddie McGuire, and guests included Simon Baker and Dennis Haysbert.

Winners and nominees
In the tables below, winners are listed first and highlighted in bold.

Gold Logie

Acting/Presenting

Most Popular Programs

Most Outstanding Programs

Performers
Steve Irwin
Delta Goodrem
Bec Cartwright
Sophie Monk
Dannii Minogue

Hall of Fame
After several years on Australian television, Don Lane became the 20th inductee into the TV Week Logies Hall of Fame.

References

External links
 

2003
2003 television awards
2003 in Australian television
2003 awards in Australia